Dmitri Markov (born 14 March 1975 in Vitebsk, Byelorussian SSR) is a retired Belarusian-Australian pole vaulter. He is a former world champion and current Oceanian record holder.  His gold medal winning jump at the 2001 World Championships made him the third person ever (of seven, as of 2021) to clear .

Biography
He originally competed for his birth country Belarus, but fell out with the Belarusian Athletics Federation and refused to compete for the country at the 1998 European Championships. He moved to Australia and was granted citizenship in 1999. He soon set a new Oceanian record in pole vault with  having already jumped  in 1998 while representing Belarus.

His best Olympic performance was in 2000 when he finished fifth. His last major competition was the Commonwealth Games in Melbourne, where he won the silver medal with a  vault.

He was named Western Australian Sports Star of the Year in 2001. Dmitri was the South Australian 2005-2006 Open Male Athlete of the Year and inducted into the South Australian Hall of Fame in 2007. In 2012 he was inducted into the Athletics Australia Hall of Fame.

Dmitiri Markov announced his retirement in early 2007 due to chronic foot injuries. His last competition was the World Athletics Tour in Melbourne on 2 March 2007.

His son Oleg Markov is a promising young Australian rules footballer, who has been drafted into the Australian Football League at the 2015 AFL draft by the Richmond Tigers.

Achievements

Personal best
Pole Vault:  (2001)

See also
List of nationality transfers in athletics
List of pole vaulters who reached 6 metres

References

1975 births
Living people
Sportspeople from Vitebsk
Australian male pole vaulters
Belarusian male pole vaulters
Belarusian emigrants to Australia
Athletes (track and field) at the 1996 Summer Olympics
Olympic athletes of Belarus
Athletes (track and field) at the 2000 Summer Olympics
Athletes (track and field) at the 2004 Summer Olympics
Olympic athletes of Australia
Athletes (track and field) at the 2006 Commonwealth Games
Commonwealth Games silver medallists for Australia
Western Australian Sports Star of the Year winners
Track and field athletes from Western Australia
World Athletics Championships medalists
Commonwealth Games medallists in athletics
Goodwill Games medalists in athletics
World Athletics Championships winners
Competitors at the 2001 Goodwill Games
Medallists at the 2006 Commonwealth Games